USS Mercury may refer to:

  was a ketch authorized by the Continental Congress in 1776 and captured off the Grand Banks of Newfoundland by the Royal Navy 10 September 1780
  was a schooner built in 1781 and served the Continental Navy as a packet, but facts of her service are unknown
  was a revenue cutter launched 6 April 1807 and served the Revenue Cutter Service until 1820
  was a sidewheel steamer tug purchased and rebuilt by the US Navy in 1861 and decommissioned in 1870
  was originally the German SS Barbarossa seized by the US Navy and used to ferry troops during World War I
  was acquired by the US Navy 20 June 1941 and decommissioned 28 May 1959
  was a missile range instrumentation ship acquired by MSTS in 1965.

References

United States Navy ship names